Krystian Stępniowski (born 5 December 1992) is a Polish professional footballer who most recently played as a goalkeeper for Stal Rzeszów.

Honours
Stal Rzeszów
II liga: 2021–22

References

External links

1992 births
Living people
Polish footballers
Poland youth international footballers
Association football goalkeepers
Hutnik Nowa Huta players
Górnik Zabrze players
Puszcza Niepołomice players
MKS Cracovia (football) players
Zagłębie Sosnowiec players
Stal Rzeszów players
II liga players
I liga players
Ekstraklasa players